John Frenett is an English bassist, best known for his slippery dub-style playing in the bands Moonshake and Laika in the 1990s.

He had formed The Hangovers with former The Raincoats member Gina Birch, and played bass and guitar on their debut album, Slow Dirty Tears released in 1998.  He had contributed bass to "Tamagnocchi" on Mouse on Mars' Autoditacker LP in 1997.

References

English bass guitarists
English male guitarists
Male bass guitarists
Laika (band) members
Living people
Year of birth missing (living people)